Amorpha nitens, the shining false indigo, is a species of flowering plant in the pea family. It is native to the southern United States, in Arkansas, Tennessee, Oklahoma, Louisiana, Illinois, Alabama, Georgia, Kentucky and South Carolina.

References

Flora of the Southeastern United States
nitens